National parks of Sweden are managed by the Swedish Environmental Protection Agency (EPA) and owned by the state. The goal of the national park service is to create a system of protected areas that represent all the distinct natural regions of the country. In 1909, Sweden became the first country in Europe to establish such parks when nine were opened following the Riksdag passing of a law on national parks that year.

According to the EPA, Swedish national parks must represent unique landscape types and be effectively protected and used for research, recreation, and tourism without damaging nature. Mountain terrain dominates approximatively 90% of the parks' combined area. Many of the northern parks are part of the Laponian area, one of Sweden's UNESCO World Heritage Sites due to its preserved natural landscape and habitat for the native reindeer-herding Sami people. Fulufjället National Park is part of PAN Parks, a network founded by the World Wildlife Fund (WWF) to provide better long-term conservation and tourism management of European national parks.



National parks

Future national parks

In 2008, after investigations and interviews with the participating counties, the Swedish Environmental Protection Agency laid down a plan to establish 13 new national parks in the near future. According to the plan, seven of the parks will be established between 2009 and 2013, the first being Kosterhavet National Park which was inaugurated in September 2009. It is currently unknown when the six remaining parks will be established.

See also
 List of World Heritage Sites in Sweden

References

Sweden
National parks
National parks